WTS .50 BMG is a bolt action, .50 caliber pistol manufactured by WTS Waffentechnik in Suhl GmbH, a German firearm manufacturer.  The gun is equipped with a grip safety and a muzzle brake featuring two chambers.  The trigger is multi-stage and adjustable.

References 

.50 caliber handguns